The Intergovernmental Authority on Development (IGAD) is an eight-country trade bloc in Africa. It includes governments from the Horn of Africa, Nile Valley and the African Great Lakes. It is headquartered in Djibouti.

Member states
Horn of Africa
 (founding member, since 1986)
 (founding member, since 1986)
 (founding member, since 1986)
 (admitted 1993, withdrew 2007, readmitted 2011)

Nile Valley
 (founding member, since 1986)
 (admitted 2011, suspended December 2021)

African Great Lakes
 (founding member, since 1986)
 (founding member, since 1986)

Formation
The Intergovernmental Authority on Development was established in 1996. It succeeded the earlier Intergovernmental Authority on Drought and Development (IGADD), a multinational body founded in 1986 by Djibouti, Ethiopia, Somalia, Sudan, Uganda and Kenya, with a focus on development and environmental control. IGADD's headquarters were later moved to Djibouti, following an agreement signed in January 1986 by the member states. Eritrea joined the organization in 1993, upon achieving independence.

In April 1995, the Assembly of Heads of State and Government met in Addis Ababa, where they agreed to strengthen cooperation through the organization. This was followed with the signing of a Letter of Instrument to Amend the IGADD Charter / Agreement on 21 March 1996. The Revitalised IGAD, a new organizational structure, was eventually launched on 25 November 1996 in Djibouti.

IGASOM/AMISOM

In September 2006, the AU Peace and Security Council approved an IGAD proposal to deploy an IGAD Peace Support Mission in Somalia (IGASOM).

On 21 February 2007, the United Nations Security Council approved Resolution 1744, which authorized the deployment of a new African Union Mission to Somalia (AMISOM) in place of IGASOM.

Current situation

IGAD is a principal supporter of the Federal Government of Somalia and backed it through the AMISOM and ATMIS initiatives.
IGAD expanded its activities in 2008 with initiatives to improve the investment, trade and banking environments of member states. The organization stressed the deployment of highly innovative programmes and mechanisms.

Structure
The Assembly of Heads of State and Government is the supreme policy making organ of the Authority. It determines the objectives, guidelines and programs for IGAD and meets once a year. A Chairman is elected from among the member states in rotation.
The Secretariat is headed by an Executive Secretary appointed by the Assembly of Heads of State and Government for a term of four years renewable once. The Secretariat assists member states in formulating regional projects in the priority areas, facilitates the coordination and harmonization of development policies, mobilizes resources to implement regional projects and programs approved by the council and reinforces national infrastructures necessary for implementing regional projects and policies. The current Executive Secretary is Workneh Gebeyehu of  Ethiopia (since 29 November 2019).
The Council of Ministers is composed of the Ministers of Foreign Affairs and one other Minister designated by each member state. The Council formulates policy, approves the work program and annual budget of the Secretariat during its biannual sessions.
The Committee of Ambassadors comprises IGAD member states' Ambassadors or Plenipotentiaries accredited to the country of IGAD Headquarters. It convenes as often as the need arises to advise and guide the Executive Secretary.

Ambassador Mahboub Maalim handed over as Executive Secretary  to Workneh Gebeyehu in late 2019. Maalim, a Kenyan nominee, had served from 2008 to 2019.

Comparison with other regional trade blocs

See also
East African Community (EAC)
Common Market for Eastern and Southern Africa (COMESA)

Notes

External links
IGAD official site
Agreement Establishing the Intergovernmental Authority on Development
IGAD Profile (Institute for Security Studies)
Conflict Early Warning and Response Mechanism (CEWARN)

Politics of Africa
Regional Economic Communities of the African Union
African Union
Trade blocs
1986 establishments in Africa